José Marcos Costa Martins (born 23 October 1999), commonly known as Marquinhos, is a Brazilian professional footballer who plays as a forward for Ferencváros.

Career statistics

Club

Notes

Honours
Atlético Mineiro
Campeonato Mineiro: 2020

Ferencvárosi
 Nemzeti Bajnokság I: 2021–22
 Magyar Kupa: 2021–22

References

1999 births
Living people
Brazilian footballers
Association football forwards
Campeonato Brasileiro Série A players
First Professional Football League (Bulgaria) players
Clube Atlético Mineiro players
Associação Chapecoense de Futebol players
Botev Plovdiv players
Ferencvárosi TC footballers
Brazilian expatriate footballers
Brazilian expatriate sportspeople in Bulgaria
Expatriate footballers in Bulgaria
Brazilian expatriate sportspeople in Hungary
Expatriate footballers in Hungary